Kenneth Murchison (1794 - 1 August 1854) was the Resident Councillor of Penang and Resident Councillor of Singapore, as well as the third Governor of the Straits Settlements.

Early life
Murchison was born in Scotland in 1794 to Barbara (née Mackenzie) and Kenneth Murchison. His elder brother was geologist Roderick Murchison.  The family moved from Ross-shire in Scotland to Bathampton in Somerset England for his father to recuperate from an illness, but he would die there in 1796.  His mother then took the family to Edinburgh and remarried.

Career
He began his working career with the East India Company.  He was appointed the Resident Councillor of Penang on 29 November 1827, he was also appointed the Resident Councillor of Singapore. While he was Resident in Penang, he conducted a geological survey of Penang on behalf of his brother Roderick Murchison, who was President of the Geological Society. He became the Governor of the Straits Settlements on 7 December 1833, however, he spent much of his time as Governor outside of Southeast Asia, and the administrative duty was performed by his deputy George Bonham. Bonham took over as Governor on 18 November 1836.

Personal life
Murchison was married to Charlotte Pryce in 1815 and had a daughter Charlotte. His first wife died in 1816, and he married Anne Nesham in 1826 with whom he had two surviving sons, Kenneth-Robert and Roderick.

He died on 1 August 1854.

References

1794 births
1854 deaths
History of Penang
Governors of Penang
Administrators in British Penang
Governors of the Straits Settlements
Administrators in British Singapore
Chief Secretaries of Singapore